Vladimir Turina (6 February 1913 – 22 October 1968) was a Croatian architect. His work was part of the architecture event in the art competition at the 1948 Summer Olympics.

References

1913 births
1968 deaths
20th-century Croatian architects
Olympic competitors in art competitions
People from Banja Luka